Fifth Avenue is a major and prominent thoroughfare in the borough of Manhattan in New York City. It stretches north from Washington Square Park in Greenwich Village to West 143rd Street in Harlem. It is one of the most expensive shopping streets in the world.

Fifth Avenue carries two-way traffic from 142nd to 135th Street and carries one-way traffic southbound for the remainder of its route. The entire street used to carry two-way traffic until 1966. From 124th to 120th Street, Fifth Avenue is cut off by Marcus Garvey Park, with southbound traffic diverted around the park via Mount Morris Park West. Most of the avenue has a bus lane, though not a bike lane. Fifth Avenue is the traditional route for many celebratory parades in New York City, and is closed on several Sundays per year.

Fifth Avenue was originally only a narrower thoroughfare but the section south of Central Park was widened in 1908. The midtown blocks between 34th and 59th Streets were largely a residential area until the turn of the 20th century, when they were developed as commercial areas. The section of Fifth Avenue in the 50s is consistently ranked among the most expensive shopping streets in the world, and the section between 59th and 96th Streets across Central Park was nicknamed "Millionaire's Row" in the early 20th century due to the high concentration of mansions there. A section of Fifth Avenue running from 82nd to 110th Streets, also alongside Central Park, is also nicknamed Museum Mile due to the large number of museums there.

History

Early history 
Fifth Avenue between 42nd Street and Central Park South (59th Street) was relatively undeveloped through the late 19th century. The surrounding area was once part of the common lands of the city of New York, which was allocated "all the waste, vacant, unpatented, and unappropriated lands" as a result of the 1686 Dongan Charter. The city's Common Council came to own a large amount of land, primarily in the middle of the island away from the Hudson and East Rivers, as a result of grants by the Dutch provincial government to the colony of New Amsterdam.

The lots along what is now Fifth Avenue were laid out in the late 18th century following the American Revolutionary War.  The city's Common Council had, starting in June 1785, attempted to raise money by selling property. The land that the Council owned was not suitable for farming or residential estates, and it was also far away from any roads or waterways. To divide the common lands into sellable lots, and to lay out roads to service them, the Council hired Casimir Goerck to survey them.  Goerck was instructed to make lots of about  each and to lay out roads to access the lots. He completed his task in December 1785, creating 140 lots of varying sizes, oriented with the east–west axis longer than the north–south axis. As part of the plan, Goerck drew up a street called Middle Road, which eventually became Fifth Avenue.

The topography of the lots contributed to the public's reluctance to buy the lots. By 1794, with the city growing ever more populated and the inhabited area constantly moving north towards the Common Lands, the Council decided to try again, hiring Goerck once more to re-survey and map the area. He was instructed to make the lots more uniform and rectangular and to lay out roads to the west and east of Middle Road, as well as to lay out east–west streets of  each. Goerck's East and West Roads later became Fourth and Sixth Avenues, while Goerck's cross streets became the modern-day numbered east–west streets. Goerck took two years to survey the 212 lots which encompassed the entire Common Lands. The Commissioners' Plan of 1811, which prescribed the street plan for Manhattan, was heavily inspired from Goerck's two surveys.

19th century 

From the early 19th century, some plots on Fifth Avenue in Midtown were acquired by the wealthy and by institutions. In the mid-19th century, Fifth Avenue between 40th and 59th Streets was home to several institutions such as the Colored Orphan Asylum, the Deaf and Dumb Asylum, the Roman Catholic Orphan Asylum, and St. Luke's Hospital. Other uses such as a cattle farm remained until the 1860s.

The portion of Fifth Avenue in Midtown became an upscale residential area following the American Civil War. Among the first people to develop such structures was Mary Mason Jones, who built the "Marble Row" on the eastern side of Fifth Avenue from 57th to 58th Streets between 1868 and 1870. Her sister Rebecca Colford Jones erected ornate houses of her own one block south. Further development came in the late 1870s with the construction of three Vanderbilt family residences along Fifth Avenue between 51st and 59th Streets (the William H., William K., and Cornelius II mansions). In the 1880s and 1890s, the ten blocks of Fifth Avenue south of Central Park (at 59th Street) were known as "Vanderbilt Row".

The Vanderbilts' relocation prompted many business owners on Fifth Avenue between Madison Square and 34th Street to move uptown. The upper section of Fifth Avenue on the Upper East Side, facing the newly created Central Park, was not developed at that time because of what the Real Estate Record and Guide described as the presence of "no opposite neighbors", as the Upper West Side was not yet developed.

Early 20th century 
The midtown blocks were largely a residential area until the turn of the 20th century, when they were developed as commercial areas. As early as 1900, rising traffic led to proposals to restrict traffic on the avenue. The section south of Central Park was widened starting in 1908, sacrificing wide sidewalks to accommodate the increasing traffic. As part of the widening project, the New York City government ordered the removal of stoops and other "encroachments" onto the sidewalk in February 1908. The buildings that needed to be trimmed included the Waldorf–Astoria hotel. By early 1911, the avenue had been widened south of 47th Street. Later that year, when widening commenced on the section between 47th and 59th Streets, many of the mansions on that stretch of Fifth Avenue were truncated or demolished. In addition, the front facades of St. Patrick's Cathedral and the Fifth Avenue Presbyterian Church were relocated, and the gardens in front of the St. Regis and Gotham hotels had to be destroyed.

The first commercial building on Fifth Avenue was erected by Benjamin Altman who bought the corner lot on the northeast corner of 34th Street in 1896. The B. Altman and Company Building was erected between 1906 and 1914, occupying the whole of its block front. The result was the creation of a high-end shopping district that attracted fashionable women and the upscale stores that wished to serve them. The Lord & Taylor Building, formerly Lord & Taylor's flagship store and now a WeWork office, was built at Fifth Avenue and 38th Street in 1914. The Saks Fifth Avenue Building, serving as Saks Fifth Avenue's flagship, opened between 49th and 50th Streets in 1924. The Bergdorf Goodman Building between 57th and 58th Streets, the flagship of Bergdorf Goodman, opened in stages between 1928 and 1929.

By the 1920s, Fifth Avenue was the most active area for development in Midtown, and developers were starting to build north of 45th Street, which had previously been considered the boundary for profitable developments. The most active year for construction in that decade was 1926, when thirty office buildings were constructed on Fifth Avenue. The two-block-wide area between Fifth and Park Avenues, which represented eight percent of Manhattan's land area, contained 25% of developments that commenced between 1924 and 1926.

In the 1920s, traffic towers controlled important intersections along the lower portion of Fifth Avenue. The idea of using patrolmen to control traffic at busy Fifth Avenue intersections was introduced as early as 1914. The first such towers were installed in 1920 upon a gift by Dr. John A. Harriss, who paid for patrolmen's sheds in the middle of Fifth Avenue at 34th, 38th, 42nd, 50th and 57th Streets. Two years later, the Fifth Avenue Association gave seven  bronze traffic towers, designed by Joseph H. Freedlander, at important intersections between 14th and 57th Streets for a total cost of $126,000. The traffic signals reduced travel time along Fifth Avenue between 34th and 57th Streets, from 40 minutes before the installation of the traffic towers to 15 minutes afterward. Freedlander's towers were removed in 1929 after they were deemed to be obstacles to the movement of traffic. He was commissioned to design bronze traffic signals at the corners of these intersections, with statues of Mercury atop the signals. The Mercury signals survived through 1964, and some of the statues were restored in 1971.

Mid-20th century to present 
In 1954, rising traffic led to a proposal to limit use of the avenue to buses and taxis only. On January 14, 1966, Fifth Avenue below 135th Street was changed to carry only one-way traffic southbound, and Madison Avenue was changed to one-way northbound. Both avenues had previously carried bidirectional traffic.

Through the late 1960s and early 1970s, many of the upscale retailers that once lined Fifth Avenue's midtown section moved away or closed altogether. According to a 1971 survey of the avenue, conducted by the Office of Midtown Planning under the leadership of Jaquelin T. Robertson, only 57 percent of building frontages between 34th and 57th Street were used as stores. The remaining frontage, including was used for companies such as banks and airline ticket offices. The section between 34th and 42nd Street, once the main shopping district on Fifth Avenue, was identified in the survey as being in decline. The section between 42nd and 50th Street was characterized as having almost no ground-level retail. The section between 50th Street and Grand Army Plaza was identified as having a robust retail corridor that was starting to decay.

In February 1971, New York City mayor John Lindsay proposed a special zoning district to preserve the retail character of Fifth Avenue's midtown section. The legislation prescribed a minimum percentage of retail space for new buildings on Fifth Avenue, but it also provided "bonuses", such as additional floor area, for buildings that had more than the minimum amount of retail. The legislation also encouraged the construction of several mixed-use buildings with retail at the lowest stories, offices at the middle stories, and apartments at the top stories. The types of retail included in this legislation were strictly defined; for example, airline ticket offices and banks did not count toward the retail space. Furthermore, new skyscrapers on the eastern side of the avenue were allowed to be built up to the boundary of the sidewalk. The New York City Planning Commission approved this legislation in March 1971. The legislation was adopted that April. Just before the legislation was enacted, American Airlines leased a ground-level storefront on the corner of Fifth Avenue and 53rd Street; Robertson initially disputed the move, even though it had been finalized before the legislation was proposed. As part of an experiment in 1970, Lindsay closed Fifth Avenue between 42nd and 57th Street to vehicular traffic for seven hours on Saturdays.

In 1998, a midblock crosswalk was installed south of the intersection of Fifth Avenue and 50th Street, part of an experiment to allow vehicular traffic to turn without conflicting with pedestrians. At the time, it was one of a few midblock crosswalks in the city. The former southern crosswalk at Fifth Avenue and 50th Street was fenced off. A similar crosswalk was later installed south of 49th Street. Both crosswalks were removed in 2019.

During three Sundays in December 2022, the NYCDOT closed Fifth Avenue between 48th and 57th Streets to all vehicular traffic. Excluding special events such as parades, this was the first time since the 1970s that the midtown section of Fifth Avenue was closed to vehicular traffic.

Description

Fifth Avenue originates at Washington Square Park in Greenwich Village and runs northwards through the heart of Midtown, along the eastern side of Central Park, where it forms the boundary of the Upper East Side and through Harlem, where it terminates at the Harlem River at 142nd Street. Traffic crosses the river on the Madison Avenue Bridge.

Fifth Avenue serves as the dividing line for house numbering and west–east streets in Manhattan; for example, it separates East 59th Street from West 59th Street. Higher-numbered avenues such as Sixth Avenue are to the west of Fifth Avenue, while lower-numbered avenues such as Third Avenue are to the east. Address numbers on west–east streets increase in both directions as one moves away from Fifth Avenue. A hundred street address numbers were provided for every block to the east or west of Fifth Avenue; for instance, the addresses on West 50th Street between Fifth and Sixth Avenues were numbered 1–99 West 50th Street, and between Sixth and Seventh Avenues 100–199 West 50th Street. The building lot numbering system worked similarly on the East Side before Madison and Lexington Avenues were added to the street grid laid out in the Commissioners' Plan of 1811. Unlike at other avenues, west–east street addresses do not increment to the next hundred to the east of Madison and Lexington Avenues.

The "most expensive street in the world" moniker changes depending on currency fluctuations and local economic conditions from year to year. For several years starting in the mid-1990s, the shopping district between 49th and 57th Streets was ranked as having the world's most expensive retail spaces on a cost per square foot basis. In 2008, Forbes magazine ranked Fifth Avenue as being the most expensive street in the world. Some of the most coveted real estate on Fifth Avenue are the penthouses perched atop the buildings.

The American Planning Association (APA) compiled a list of "2012 Great Places in America" and declared Fifth Avenue to be one of the greatest streets to visit in America. This historic street has many world-renowned museums, businesses and stores, parks, luxury apartments, and historical landmarks that are reminiscent of its history and vision for the future.

Traffic pattern

Fifth Avenue from 142nd Street to 135th Street carries two-way traffic. Fifth Avenue carries one-way traffic southbound from 143rd Street to 142nd Street and from 135th Street to Washington Square North. The changeover to one-way traffic south of 135th Street took place on January 14, 1966, at which time Madison Avenue was changed to one way uptown (northbound). From 124th Street to 120th Street, Fifth Avenue is cut off by Marcus Garvey Park, with southbound traffic diverted around the park via Mount Morris Park West.

Parade route
Fifth Avenue is the traditional route for many celebratory parades in New York City; thus, it is closed to traffic on numerous Sundays in warm weather. The longest running parade is the annual St. Patrick's Day Parade. Parades held are distinct from the ticker-tape parades held on the "Canyon of Heroes" on lower Broadway, and the Macy's Thanksgiving Day Parade held on Broadway from the Upper West Side downtown to Herald Square. Fifth Avenue parades usually proceed from south to north, with the exception of the LGBT Pride March, which goes north to south to end in Greenwich Village. The Latino literary classic by New Yorker Giannina Braschi, entitled "Empire of Dreams", takes place on the Puerto Rican Day Parade on Fifth Avenue.

Bicycling route
Bicycling on Fifth Avenue ranges from segregated with a bike lane south of 23rd Street, to scenic along Central Park, to dangerous through Midtown with very heavy traffic during rush hours. There is no dedicated bike lane along most of Fifth Avenue. A protected bike lane south of 23rd Street was added in 2017, and another protected lane for bidirectional bike traffic between 110th and 120th Streets was announced in 2020.

In July 1987, then New York City Mayor Edward Koch proposed banning bicycling on Fifth, Park, and Madison Avenues during weekdays, but many bicyclists protested and had the ban overturned. When the trial was started on August 24, 1987, for 90 days to ban bicyclists from these three avenues from 31st Street to 59th Street between 10 a.m. and 4 p.m. on weekdays, mopeds would not be banned. On August 31, 1987, a state appeals court judge halted the ban for at least a week pending a ruling after opponents against the ban brought a lawsuit.

Public transportation

Bus
Fifth Avenue is one of the few major streets in Manhattan along which streetcars did not operate. Instead, transportation along Fifth Avenue was initially provided by the Fifth Avenue Transportation Company, which provided horse-drawn service from 1885 to 1896. It was replaced by Fifth Avenue Coach, which continued to offer bus service. Double-decker buses were operated by the Fifth Avenue Coach Company until 1953 and again by MTA Regional Bus Operations from 1976 to 1978.

A bus lane for Fifth Avenue within Midtown was announced in 1982. Initially it ran from 59th to 34th Streets. The bus lane opened in June 1983 and was restricted to buses on weekdays from 7 a.m. to 7 p.m. In June 2020, mayor Bill de Blasio announced that the city would test out busways on Fifth Avenue from 57th to 34th Street. Despite a deadline of October 2020, the Fifth Avenue busway was not in place at that time.

Today, local bus service along Fifth Avenue is provided by the MTA's M1, M2, M3, and M4 buses. The M5 and Q32 also run on Fifth Avenue in Midtown, while the M55 runs on Fifth Avenue south of 44th Street. Numerous express buses from Brooklyn, the Bronx, and Staten Island also run along Fifth Avenue.

Subway
The New York City Subway has never built a line underneath Fifth Avenue, likely because wealthy Fifth Avenue residents would have objected to any such line. However, there are several subway stations along streets that cross Fifth Avenue:
 at 
 at 
 at Fifth Avenue and 42nd Street
 at Fifth Avenue and 23rd Street

Nicknames

Upper Fifth Avenue/Millionaire's Row
In the late 19th century, the very rich of New York began building mansions along the stretch of Fifth Avenue between 59th Street and 96th Street, looking onto Central Park. By the early 20th century, the portion of Fifth Avenue between 59th and 96th Streets had been nicknamed "Millionaire's Row", with mansions such as the Mrs. William B. Astor House and William A. Clark House. Entries to Central Park along this stretch include Inventor's Gate at 72nd Street, which gave access to the park's carriage drives, and Engineers' Gate at 90th Street, used by equestrians.

A milestone change for Fifth Avenue came in 1916, when the grand corner mansion at 72nd Street and Fifth Avenue that James A. Burden Jr. had erected in 1893 became the first private mansion on Fifth Avenue above 59th Street to be demolished to make way for a grand apartment house. The building at 907 Fifth Avenue began a trend, with its 12 stories around a central court, with two apartments to a floor. Its strong cornice above the fourth floor, just at the eaves height of its neighbors, was intended to soften its presence.

Architect J. E. R. Carpenter brought suit, and won a verdict overturning the height restriction in 1923. Carpenter argued that "the avenue would be greatly improved in appearance when deluxe apartments would replace the old-style mansions." Led by real estate investors Benjamin Winter, Sr. and Frederick Brown, the old mansions were quickly torn down and replaced with apartment buildings.

This area contains many notable apartment buildings, including 810 Fifth Avenue and the Park Cinq, many of them built in the 1920s by architects such as Rosario Candela and J. E. R. Carpenter. A very few post-World War II structures break the unified limestone frontage, notably the Solomon R. Guggenheim Museum between 88th and 89th Streets.

Museum Mile
Museum Mile is the name for a section of Fifth Avenue running from 82nd to 110th streets on the Upper East Side, in an area sometimes called Upper Carnegie Hill. The Mile, which contains one of the densest displays of culture in the world, is actually three blocks longer than one mile (1.6 km). Nine museums occupy the length of this section of Fifth Avenue. A ninth museum, the Museum for African Art, joined the ensemble in 2009; its museum at 110th Street, the first new museum constructed on the Mile since the Guggenheim in 1959, opened in late 2012.

In addition to other programming, the museums collaborate for the annual Museum Mile Festival to promote the museums and increase visitation. The Museum Mile Festival traditionally takes place here on the second Tuesday in June from 6 – 9 p.m. It was established in 1979 by Lisa Taylor to increase public awareness of its member institutions and promote public support of the arts in New York City. The nine museums are open free that evening to the public. Several of the participating museums offer outdoor art activities for children, live music and street performers. During the event, Fifth Avenue is closed to traffic.

Museums on the mile include:
110th Street – The Africa Center
105th Street – El Museo del Barrio
103rd Street – Museum of the City of New York
92nd Street – The Jewish Museum
91st Street – Cooper Hewitt, Smithsonian Design Museum (part of the Smithsonian Institution)
89th Street – National Academy Museum and School of Fine Arts
88th Street – Solomon R. Guggenheim Museum
86th Street – Neue Galerie New York
82nd Street – The Metropolitan Museum of Art

Further south, on the corner of Fifth Avenue and 70th Street, lies the Henry Clay Frick House, which houses the Frick Collection.

Historical landmarks 

Buildings on Fifth Avenue can have one of several types of official landmark designations:
 The New York City Landmarks Preservation Commission is the New York City agency that is responsible for identifying and designating the city's landmarks and the buildings in the city's historic districts. New York City landmarks (NYCL) can be categorized into one of several groups: individual (exterior), interior, and scenic landmarks.
 The National Register of Historic Places (NRHP) is the United States federal government's official list of districts, sites, buildings, structures and objects deemed worthy of preservation for their historical significance.
 The National Historic Landmark (NHL) focuses on places of significance in American history, architecture, engineering, or culture; all NHL sites are also on the NRHP.
 World Heritage Sites are designated by UNESCO as having cultural, historical, scientific or other form of significance, and are legally protected by international treaties.

Individual landmarks 
Below is a list of historic sites on Fifth Avenue, from north to south. Buildings within historic districts, but no individual landmark designation, are not included in this table.

Historic districts 
There are numerous historic districts through which Fifth Avenue passes. From north to south, the districts are:
 The Carnegie Hill Historic District, a city landmark district, which covers 400 buildings, primarily along Fifth Avenue from 86th to 98th Street, as well as on side streets extending east to Madison, Park, and Lexington Avenues.
 The Metropolitan Museum Historic District, a city landmark district, which consists of properties on Fifth Avenue between 79th and 86th Streets, outside the Metropolitan Museum of Art, as well as properties on several side streets.
 The Upper East Side Historic District, a city and NRHP district. The city district runs from 59th to 78th Streets along Fifth Avenue, and up to Third Avenue at some points.
 The Madison Square North Historic District, a city landmark district, which covers 96 buildings from 25th to 29th Streets around Broadway, Fifth Avenue, and side streets.
 The Ladies' Mile Historic District, a city landmark district, which covers 440 buildings from roughly 15th Street to 24th Street and from Park Avenue South to west of Sixth Avenue.
 The Greenwich Village Historic District, a city landmark district, which covers much of Greenwich Village and includes almost all buildings on Fifth Avenue south of 12th Street.

In the 1980s, there was also a proposal for a historic district on Fifth Avenue between 48th and 58th Streets. At the time, St. Patrick's Cathedral, St. Thomas Church, the Cartier Building at number 651, the University Club, the Rizzoli Building at number 712, and the Coty Building at number 714 were official city landmarks. However, other structures on that strip had no protection yet, including Rockefeller Center, the Elizabeth Arden Building at 689 Fifth Avenue, the St. Regis Hotel, the Peninsula Hotel, and the Bergdorf Goodman Building.

Other 
In addition, the cooperative apartment building at 2 Fifth Avenue was named a New York cultural landmark on December 12, 2013, by the Historic Landmark Preservation Center, as the last residence of former New York City Mayor Ed Koch.

Economy

Between 49th Street and 60th Street, Fifth Avenue is lined with prestigious boutiques and flagship stores and is consistently ranked among the most expensive shopping streets in the world.

Many luxury goods, fashion, and sport brand boutiques are on Fifth Avenue, including Louis Vuitton, Tiffany & Co. (whose flagship is at 57th Street), Gucci, Prada, Armani, Tommy Hilfiger, Cartier, Omega, Chanel, Harry Winston, Salvatore Ferragamo, Nike, Escada, Rolex, Bvlgari, Emilio Pucci, Ermenegildo Zegna, Abercrombie & Fitch, Hollister Co., De Beers, Emanuel Ungaro, Gap, Versace, Lindt Chocolate Shop, Henri Bendel, NBA Store, Oxxford Clothes, Microsoft Store, Sephora, Tourneau, and Wempe. Luxury department stores include Saks Fifth Avenue and Bergdorf Goodman. Fifth Avenue also is home to an Apple Store.

Many airlines at one time had ticketing offices along Fifth Avenue. In the years leading up to 1992, the number of ticketing offices along Fifth Avenue decreased. Pan American World Airways went out of business, while Air France, Finnair, and KLM moved their ticket offices to other areas in Midtown Manhattan.

Gallery

See also

 List of shopping streets and districts by city
 Jerome Avenue, a shopping street and major thoroughfare in the Bronx
 Fifth Avenue Mile, annual road race

References
Notes

Further reading

 (Note: Erroneously states the northern boundary of Museum Mile is East 104th Street.)

External links 

 Fifth Avenue Photos
 Fifth Avenue Directory and Images
 Greek Independence Day Parade, Fifth Avenue 
 New York Songlines: Fifth Avenue
 APA Great Places in America
 National Historic Landmarks in New York State

 
05
Economy of New York City
Art gallery districts
Culture of Manhattan
Museum districts
Museums in Manhattan
Tourist attractions in Manhattan
East Harlem
Flatiron District
Greenwich Village
Harlem
Midtown Manhattan
Upper East Side
Upper class culture in New York City